Mangalam Dam is a dam built across the river Cherukunnapuzha (a tributary of Mangalam River) in Palakkad district of Kerala, India. The dam has a capacity of 25.34 million cubic feet. A canal system for irrigation purpose was completed and opened in 1966, in the Alathur taluk of Palakkad district.

Geography
Most of the inhabitants come from, Perumbavoor Kottayam or Chalakkudy. There are rubber, pepper, coffee, and tapioca plantations in the area.

Mangalam dam is 16 km away from Vadakkencherry.  Karimkayam, Earth Dam, Odenthode, Kunjiarpathy, Kavilupara, Vattapara, Neethipuram, Ponkandam, Kadappara, Uppumanne, Olipara, Balaswaram-V.R.T and Choorupara are also in the area.

A big landslide occurred in Kavilupara near to Odenthode during the 2007 floods. There is a thick forest in the area of Karimkayam, Odenthode, Kadappara.

See also 
 Mangalam Dam, Palakkad

References

Dams in Kerala
Buildings and structures in Palakkad district
Bharathappuzha
Year of establishment missing